Kentucky Route 956 (KY 956) is a state secondary highway in Madison County, Kentucky, located north of Berea.  At just under  in length, KY 956 serves as a connector between Interstate 75 (I-75) and U.S. Route 25 (US 25).

Route description
KY 956 begins at an intersection with Kentucky Route 595 and Mayde Road, just east of exit 77 of I-75. KY 956 travels east one half-mile before crossing a CSX Transportation line.  Two-tenths of a mile later, the road intersects Menelaus Road, which carries Kentucky Route 1983, a rural secondary highway. From Menelaus Road, KY 956 travels another  to reach its eastern end at US 25.

Major intersections

References

External links

0956
0956